Cadaval is a municipality in the Oeste intermunicipal community and Lisbon District of Portugal. The population in 2011 was 14,228, in an area of 174.89 km².

The present Mayor is José Bernardo Nunes, elected by the Social Democratic Party.

Parishes
   
Administratively, the municipality is divided into 7 civil parishes (freguesias):
 Alguber
 Cadaval e Pêro Moniz
 Lamas e Cercal
 Painho e Figueiros
 Peral
 Vermelha
 Vilar

Notable people 
 Sofia Quintino (1879 in Lamas - 	1964) one of the first female physicians to graduate in Portugal. An active feminist and leading developer of a secular nursing service
 Júlio Fogaça (1907 in Cadaval – 1980) a Portuguese politician with a mixed history with the Portuguese Communist Party
 Micael Isidoro (born 1982 in Cadaval) a Portuguese road cyclist

References

External links
 Municipality official website
 Photos from Cadaval

 
Towns in Portugal
Populated places in Lisbon District
Municipalities of Lisbon District